XHFRT-FM is a radio station on 92.5 FM in Comitán de Domínguez, Chiapas, Mexico. It is owned by Radio Cañón and carries a grupera format known as Radio Cañón.

History
XHFRT received its concession on December 17, 1976 as XEFRT-AM 890. It was owned by Ismael de Jesús Delfín Cristiani. It was sold in 2000 and migrated to FM in 2011.

In March 2022, it leaves La Nueva before flipping to Radio Cañón with a grupera format.

References

Radio stations in Chiapas
Radio stations established in 1994